Ahmed Badouj (1950 – 22 August 2020) was a Moroccan Amazigh actor, director, screenwriter and man of the theater who was born in 1950 in Mesguina in the village of Ifrkhs (Province of Agadir, Souss-Massa-Drâa).

Life and career
Ahmed Badouj left school, from an early age, he did various odd jobs (painter, carpenter, car electrician) in order to provide for the needs of his poor family, especially his seriously ill father.

In 1978, he began his career in the theater (in Arabic), then joined the first Amazigh theater troupe "Tifawin" (lights) founded in 1985 by Lahoucine Bouizgaren. Emblematic figure of Amazigh cinema, he wrote many scenarios and many plays, including the most famous "Tagodi" (The grief), one of the first plays performed by the Tifawin troupe in the 80s, and which will be adapted in 1995 in film by Ahmed Badouj.

In 1992, he played the role of Idder in the first Amazigh film "Tamghart N'ourgh" (The woman in gold) by Lahoucine Bouizgaren. Under the direction of another pioneer of Amazigh cinema, Mohamed Mernich, he shoots in several films, including "Asnnane n Tayri" with actress Zahia Zahiri. With Larbi Altit Warda Vision's production company, which has become Warda Production, he also appears in "Tiyiti N'wadan", a two-part drama, in which he is found alongside Ahmed Nassih and Abdellatif Atif, two actors from the "Tifawin" theater company.

More recently, finally, he appeared on the small screen in the television series "Tigmi Mkourn", sitcom directed by Abdelaziz Oussaih and produced by Warda Production alongside other renowned actors such as Lahoucine Bardaouz, Abdellatif Atif and Mbark El Aattach.

Filmography

Death
Badouj had diabetes when he tested positive for COVID-19 during the COVID-19 pandemic in Morocco. He died shortly after on 22 August 2020. King Mohammed 6 sent a letter of condolence to his family.

References

External links
 

Moroccan male stage actors
Berber Moroccans
Shilha people
People from Agadir
1950 births
2020 deaths
Deaths from the COVID-19 pandemic in Morocco